The following is a list of the volumes of the Auditing and Accounting Guide series published by the American Institute of Certified Public Accountants (AICPA). The list was compiled using the resources of the University of Mississippi library.  The list also includes titles from the earlier series: AICPA Accounting Guides and AICPA Industry Audit Guides. Links to full-text of the Guides are provided for many of the titles prior to 2000. 

The Comments column provides references to sections of Accounting Standards Codification (ASC) which complement or supersede a particular Audit and Accounting Guide. The ASC is published by the Financial Accounting Standards Board, and access to the ASC is free through the Basic View on the FASB web site. The ASC became effective on July 1, 2009, and has since been the authoritative source for all U.S. GAAP, Generally Accepted Accounting Principles (USA).

Prior to the ASC, accounting standards were scattered over a number of publications issued by the FASB and the AICPA. Some publications were considered more authoritative than others, and a GAAP hierarchy of five levels was recognized; see Statement on Auditing Standards No. 69 full-text..  The AICPA Industry Audit and Accounting Guides are part of the second tier of authoritative publications in the GAAP hierarchy.

List of AICPA Audit and Accounting Guides

References

External links 
 American Institute of Certified Public Accountants (AICPA)
 Financial Accounting Standards Board (FASB)

Accounting in the United States
Auditing in the United States